Villa Squad is a football club from Dar es Salaam, Tanzania who play in the Tanzanian Second Division League. They play their home games at the Chamazi Stadium in Dar es Salaam.has cultivated players who went to feature in the Tanzanian 
national team like Haruna Moshi Shaban and Godfrey Taita.

References

 soccerway.com 

Football clubs in Tanzania